Nassawango Hills is an unincorporated community in Worcester County, Maryland, United States. Nassawango Hills is located along Maryland Route 12, northwest of Snow Hill.

References

Unincorporated communities in Worcester County, Maryland
Unincorporated communities in Maryland